Zhao Mingjian (born 22 November 1987) is a Chinese footballer who plays as a right-back or right midfielder for Chinese Super League club Shanghai Greenland Shenhua.

Club career 
Zhao Mingjian broke into the senior team of Dalian Shide at the beginning of the 2005 Chinese Super League season after graduating from their youth team. He would make his debut senior appearance for Dalian on 22 May 2005 against Shanghai Shenhua in a 2–1 defeat. As a promising midfielder Zhao Mingjian would play in several further games during the season and go on to win the league title and Chinese FA Cup with Dalian at the end of the league season. The following seasons he would gradually establish himself as a squad regular within the team, however it was during the 2008 Chinese Super League season when Zhao confirmed himself as a vital member within the club by playing in the majority of the season and also scoring his first league goal against Changchun Yatai on November 9, 2008 in a 3–2 defeat. He became one of the few constants within the team that went through a transitional period where several managers and many youth players came in during a very disappointing season which saw the team flirt with relegation. The following season saw him continue his role as the team's first choice right-midfielder and with a young squad saw the team finish in a more respectable eighth within the league. At the end of the 2012 Chinese Super League season Dalian Shide was sold off to rival football club Dalian Aerbin F.C. after the club's owner Xu Ming was arrested for bribery.

On 6 January 2013, Zhao joined fellow top tier club Shandong Luneng for a reported 15 million Yuan. He would make his debut for the club in a league game on 14 May 2013, against Qingdao Jonoon F.C. in a 3–0 victory. Despite this victory Zhao struggled to gain a regular place within the team and he was loaned out to another Super League team in Changchun Yatai. At Changchun, Zhao would make his debut in a league game on 31 July 2013 against Qingdao Jonoon F.C. in a 1–1 draw. In his loan period Zhao would immediately establish himself as an integral member of the team that avoided relegation at the end of the season. On his return from his loan, Zhao would go on to establish himself within the Shandong team and go on to win the 2014 Chinese FA Cup with them.

On 23 February 2017, Zhao transferred to fellow Super League side Hebei China Fortune. He made his debut for Hebei on 5 March 2017 in the first match of the season which Hebei tied with Henan Jianye 0–0. After two season, Zhao joined his hometown club Dalian Yifang on 13 February 2019. He made his debut on 3 March 2019 in a league game against Henan Jianye F.C. in a 1–1 draw. At the end of the season he would only make a handful of games for the club and he was allowed to join Shanghai Shenhua on 24 January 2020. On 4 August 2022 he would be loaned out to second tier club Kunshan where he established himself as regular within the team that won the division and promotion to the top tier at the end of the 2022 China League One campaign.

International career 
Zhao made his debut for the Chinese national team on 24 March 2016 in a 4–0 win against Maldives.

Career statistics 
Statistics accurate as of match played 31 December 2022.

Honours

Club 
Dalian Shide
 Chinese Super League: 2005
 Chinese FA Cup: 2005

Shandong Luneng
 Chinese FA Cup: 2014
 Chinese FA Super Cup: 2015

Kunshan
 China League One: 2022

References

External links 
 Squad profile at Dalian Shide F.C. website
 Player profile at sodasoccer.com
 Player stats at sohu.com
 

1987 births
Living people
Chinese footballers
China international footballers
Footballers from Dalian
Dalian Shide F.C. players
Shandong Taishan F.C. players
Changchun Yatai F.C. players
Hebei F.C. players
Dalian Professional F.C. players
Shanghai Shenhua F.C. players
Chinese Super League players
Association football midfielders